Michelle Rogers (born 21 January 1976 in Salford) is a British judoka, who competed at two Olympic Games.

Judo career
Rogers came to prominence after becoming the champion of Great Britain, winning the heavyweight division at the British Judo Championships in 1993. She would win an additional six British titles from 1999 to 2006 at either heavyweight of half-heavyweight.

In 1996, she was selected to represent Great Britain at the Olympics, competing in the heavyweight event at the 1996 Summer Olympics in Atlanta. In 1996, she also won a bronze medal at the 1996 European Judo Championships in The Hague. The following year she won a silver medal at the 1997 European Judo Championships.

In 2001, she won another bronze medal at the 2001 European Judo Championships in Paris before winning the -78kg gold medal at the 2002 Commonwealth Games in Manchester, defeating Jo Melen of Wales in the final. 
She won a fourth European medal at the 2007 European Judo Championships, in Belgrade before going to the Olympic Games for the second time. She competed at the 2008 Summer Olympics in the 78kg class.

References

External links
 
 
 

1976 births
Living people
British female judoka
Olympic judoka of Great Britain
Judoka at the 1996 Summer Olympics
Judoka at the 2008 Summer Olympics
People from Salford
Commonwealth Games medallists in judo
Commonwealth Games gold medallists for England
Universiade medalists in judo
Judoka at the 2002 Commonwealth Games
Universiade gold medalists for Great Britain
Medallists at the 2002 Commonwealth Games